Len Dineen (born 14 December 1966) is an Irish former rugby union player.

Career
The son of famous rugby commentator Len Dinneen Sr, known as the "Voice of Rugby" in Ireland, Dinneen Jr played lock for Ireland Schools between 1984 and 1985, before joining Cork Constitution and winning the inaugural All-Ireland League with the club in 1991, and regularly representing Munster during the 1990s. He also represented Ireland A, the team just below the senior national team, and joined Old Crescent in 1996.

Dinneen Jr's brothers also played rugby; Gareth won two Munster Schools Rugby Senior Cup medals with Crescent College; David won the tournament with St Munchin's College and Kevin won a Connacht Senior Cup with UCG. His son, Jack, joined the Connacht academy ahead of the 2012–13 season, and made his debut against Munster in April 2014.

References

External links
Munster Profile

Living people
1966 births
Rugby union players from County Cork
Irish rugby union players
Cork Constitution players
Munster Rugby players
Ireland Wolfhounds international rugby union players
Rugby union locks
Rugby union flankers